Villavere is a village in Viru-Nigula Parish, Lääne-Viru County in northern Estonia. Villavere has a population of 18 (as of 20 February 2012).

References

Villages in Lääne-Viru County